The 2016 Hong Kong Women's Sevens was the 19th edition of the tournament. It took place between the 7th and 8th of April. South Africa won the tournament.

Teams 
Ten teams competed in the tournament.

Tournament

Pool stages

Pool A

South Africa Select 32 - 0 Kenya
Kazakhstan 5 - 10 China
France Development 22 - 5 Kenya
South Africa Select 7 - 17 Kazakhstan
France Development 39 - 7 China
Kazakhstan 26 - 12 Kenya
South Africa Select 7 - 0 China
France Development 12 - 10 Kazakhstan 
China 19 - 5 Kenya
France Development 5 - 7 South Africa Select

Pool B

Hong Kong 45 - 0 Sri Lanka
Argentina 19 - 12 Thailand
Japan 41 - 0 Sri Lanka
Hong Kong 7 - 10 Argentina
Japan 22 - 7 Thailand
Argentina 30 - 5 Sri Lanka
Hong Kong 24 - 0 Thailand
Japan 50 - 0 Argentina
Thailand 24 - 12 Sri Lanka
Japan 7 - 14 Hong Kong

Knockout stages

Bowl

Plate

Cup

References 

2016
2016 rugby sevens competitions
2016 in women's rugby union
2016 in Asian rugby union